The 2015 Angie's List Grand Prix of Indianapolis, the second running of the event, was an IndyCar Series held on May 9, 2015, at the Indianapolis Motor Speedway. The fifth round of the 2015 IndyCar Series, it was won by Will Power of Team Penske. Graham Rahal took second for Rahal Letterman Lanigan Racing as he did in the previous round and Juan Pablo Montoya (Team Penske) came in third. The top finishing rookie in the race was Stefano Coletti who finished tenth, the highest finish for a rookie up to that point in the 2015 season, snapping Gabby Chaves' streak of being the top rookie finisher in all the previous rounds.

Report

Qualifying

Race results

Notes
All cars ran Dallara chassis with aerokits supplied by their respective engine manufacturer.

This was James Hinchcliffe's final race of the season. On May 18th during the post qualifying practice for the 2015 Indianapolis 500 he would suffer life threatening injuries and miss the remainder of the season.

Championship standings after the race

Drivers' Championship standings

 Note: Only the top five positions are included.

References

External links
 Lap Report – Verizon IndyCar Series, May 9, 2015

Grand Prix of Indianapolis
Grand Prix of Indianapolis
Grand Prix of Indianapolis